Nationality words link to articles with information on the nation's poetry or literature (for instance, Irish or France).

Events
April 17 – The Edinburgh edition of Scottish poet Robert Burns' Poems, Chiefly in the Scottish Dialect is published by William Creech including a portrait of Burns by Alexander Nasmyth. Burns has great social success in the city's literary circles; 16-year-old Walter Scott meets him at the house of Adam Ferguson. On December 4 he meets Agnes Maclehose at a party given by Miss Erskine Nimmo.

Works published

United Kingdom

 Robert Burns:
 Poems Chiefly in the Scottish Dialect (see also the editions of 1786, 1793)
 see also Richard Glover's The Scots Musical Museum, below
 Anne Francis, Charlotte to Werter
 Richard Glover, The Atheniad
 James Johnson, editor, The Scots Musical Museum, an anthology with 177 of the 600 songs written by Robert Burns, who had collected many of the others; published in six volumes from this year to 1803; Volumes 2–5 edited by Burns
 George Keate, The Distressed Poet
 Sophia Lee, A Hermit's Tale, published anonymously
 Robert Merry, Paulina; or, The Russian Daughter
 John Ogilvie, The Fame of the Druids, published anonymously
 Henry James Pye, Poems on Various Subjects, including "Aerophorion", possibly the first poem about an aviator (James Sadler (balloonist))
 Edward Rushton, West-Indian Eclogues, published anonymously
 John Thelwall, Poems on Various Subjects
 John Wolcot, writing under the pen name "Peter Pindar", Ode Upon Ode; or, A Peep at St. James
 Ann Yearsley, Poems, on Various Subjects

United States
 Joel Barlow, The Vision of Columbus, nine books; describes America as prosperous and improving, seeks to promote "the love of national liberty" in Americans (revised as The Columbiad 1807)
 James Beattie, Poems on Several Occasions
 Peter Markoe, Miscellaneous Poems

Other
 Jean-François Marmontel, Éléments de littérature, including rewritten parts of Poétique française (1763), French criticism
 Évariste-Désiré Parny, Chansons madécasses, prose poems (later set to music by Ravel; France

Births
Death years link to the corresponding "[year] in poetry" article:
 May 14 – Alexander Laing (died 1857), Scottish poet
 November 15 – Richard Henry Dana Sr. (died 1879), American poet, critic and lawyer
 November 21 – Bryan Procter ("Barry Cornwall") (died 1874), English poet
 December 16 – Mary Russell Mitford (died 1855), English novelist, poet and dramatist
 Margaret Miller Davidson, Sr. (died 1844), American novelist, mother of poets Lucretia Maria Davidson, Margaret Miller Davidson and Levi P. Davidson
 Susanna Hawkins (died 1868), Scottish poet

Deaths
Birth years link to the corresponding "[year] in poetry" article:
 February 13 – Ruđer Bošković (born 1711), Ragusan polymath and poet
 September 1 – Agatha Lovisa de la Myle (born 1724), Baltic-German and Latvian poet
 September – Moses Browne (born 1704), English poet and clergyman
 November 3 – Robert Lowth (born 1710), English Anglican Bishop, poet, professor of poetry at the University of Oxford, grammarian who wrote one of the most influential textbooks on English grammar
 December 18 – Soame Jenyns (born 1704), English writer and poet

See also

Poetry

Notes

18th-century poetry
Poetry